Henderson Hill is an ice free summit  northeast of Mount Falconer, rising to  on the north side of Taylor Valley in Victoria Land, Antarctica. The name Henderson Hill appears in a 1968 report and geologic sketch map of the area prepared by the Victoria University of Wellington Antarctic Expedition (VUWAE), 1965–66, and is presumably named after Robert A. Henderson, a member of the VUWAE field party, and later with the Museum of Comparative Zoology at Harvard University, Cambridge, Massachusetts.

References

Hills of Victoria Land
McMurdo Dry Valleys